Mountain Valley Unified School District is a public school district based in Trinity County, California, United States.

Demographics
By 2017 the 280 student MVUSD had 30 Hmong students. Superintendent Debbie Miller stated that the influx of Hmong had reversed a previous trend of enrollment decline and that the district administration wishes for more Hmong to move to the district. She added that "We’ve scrambled to figure out how we can incorporate their traditions."

References

External links
 

School districts in California
Education in Trinity County, California